Fouad Bouali (born 8 February 1960) is an Algerian football manager.

References

1960 births
Living people
Algerian football managers
WA Tlemcen managers
JSM Béjaïa managers
USM Bel Abbès managers
CR Belouizdad managers
MC Alger managers
Najran SC managers
MC Oran managers
JS Saoura managers
NA Hussein Dey managers
JSM Skikda managers
Algerian Ligue Professionnelle 1 managers
Saudi Professional League managers
Algerian expatriate football managers
Expatriate football managers in Saudi Arabia
Algerian expatriate sportspeople in Saudi Arabia
21st-century Algerian people